WKBI can refer to:

 WKBI-FM, a radio station (93.9 FM) in Saint Marys, Pennsylvania, United States
 WKBI (AM), a radio station (1400 AM) in Saint Marys, Pennsylvania, United States